John Kearney may refer to:

John Kearney (bishop), (c.1742–1813), Church of Ireland bishop of Ossory
John Kearney (artist), (1924–2014), American artist, famous for making figurative sculptures, often of animals
John Kearney (soldier), former member of Clann na Gael and Agent Provocateur.
 John Kearney (racing driver) American race car driver